Oh Henry! is an American candy bar containing peanuts, caramel, and fudge coated in chocolate.

History
There are multiple versions of the Oh Henry! bar origin story.  The manufacturer Nestlé says that the bar was introduced by George Williamson and his Williamson Candy Company of Chicago in 1920 in the United States. The most popular alternate story is that Thomas Henry, manager of the Peerless Candy Co. in Arkansas City, Kansas, invented a bar he called the "Tom Henry Bar" in the late 1910s, and sold the recipe to George Williamson in 1920. There is no credible documentation of this story.

There are other alternate accounts of the origin of the name of the bar. One theory is that a boy named Henry who frequented George Williamson's second candy shop. He became a favorite of the young girls who worked there, who would say "Oh Henry" when speaking to or about him, and Williamson used this phrase to name his new confection. The other story is that the name is based on the pen name of William Sydney Porter, O. Henry. Williamson was thought by some to have been a fan of O. Henry stories, and an O. Henry story about peanuts might have been read by Williamson.
 
The Williamson Company was sold to Warner-Lambert in 1965, which soon sold Oh Henry! to Terson, Inc. Nestlé acquired the United States rights to the brand from Terson in 1984. In 2018, Nestlé sold the rights to its U.S. confectionery products to Ferrara Candy Company, a subsidiary of Ferrero SpA. Ferrara quietly discontinued the US version of Oh Henry! in
2019.

Differences between Ferrara and Hershey versions
In Canada, the bar is currently sold by the Hershey Company and was manufactured at their Smiths Falls, Ontario, facilities prior to their closure. The bars are different in appearance: the Canadian version is one bar with the fudge in the center, the fudge surrounded with a thin layer of caramel, and the nuts surrounding that layer before it is surrounded in the coating. Hershey sells Oh Henry! bars made in Canada on a very limited basis in the United States as Rally bars, using the trademark of a Hershey product introduced in the 1970s and later discontinued.

See also
 List of chocolate bar brands

References

External links
 Oh Henry! from Nestlé USA

Chocolate bars
The Hershey Company brands
Products introduced in 1920
Peanut dishes